The Torino scale is a method for categorizing the impact hazard associated with near-Earth objects (NEOs) such as asteroids and comets.
It is intended as a communication tool for astronomers and the public to assess the seriousness of collision predictions, by combining probability statistics and known kinetic damage potentials into a single threat value. The Palermo Technical Impact Hazard Scale is a similar, but more complex scale. Near-Earth objects with a Torino scale of 1 are discovered several times a year, and may last a few weeks until they have a longer observation arc that eliminates any possibility of a collision. The highest rating ever assigned on the Torino Scale was given to the asteroid 99942 Apophis, which had a rating of 4 for four days in late 2004.

Overview

The Torino Scale uses an integer scale from 0 to 10. A 0 indicates an object has a negligibly small chance of collision with the Earth, compared with the usual "background noise" of collision events, or is too small to penetrate Earth's atmosphere intact. A 10 indicates that a collision is certain, and the impacting object is large enough to precipitate a global disaster.

An object is assigned a 0 to 10 value based on its collision probability and the kinetic energy (expressed in megatons of TNT) of the possible collision.

The Torino Scale is defined only for potential impacts less than 100 years in the future.

"For an object with multiple potential collisions on a set of dates, a Torino Scale value should be determined for each date. It may be convenient to summarize such an object by the greatest Torino Scale value within the set."

History and naming
The Torino Scale was created by Professor Richard P. Binzel in the Department of Earth, Atmospheric, and Planetary Sciences, at the Massachusetts Institute of Technology (MIT). The first version, called "A Near-Earth Object Hazard Index", was presented at a United Nations conference in 1995 and was published by Binzel in the subsequent conference proceedings (Annals of the New York Academy of Sciences, volume 822, 1997.)

A revised version of the "Hazard Index" was presented at a June 1999 international conference on NEOs held in Torino (Turin), Italy. The conference participants voted to adopt the revised version, where the bestowed name "Torino Scale" recognizes the spirit of international cooperation displayed at that conference toward research efforts to understand the hazards posed by NEOs. ("Torino Scale" is the proper usage, not "Turin Scale.")

Due to exaggerated press coverage of Level 1 asteroids, a rewording of the Torino Scale was published in 2005, adding more details and renaming the categories: in particular, Level 1 was changed from "Events meriting careful monitoring" to "Normal".

The Torino Scale has served as the model for the Rio scale which quantifies the validity and societal impact of SETI data.

Current Torino scale 

The Torino Scale also uses a color code scale: white, green, yellow, orange, red. Each color code has an overall meaning:

No incoming object has ever been rated above level 4, though over all of Earth's history impacts have spanned the full range of damage described by the scale.

Actual impacts and impact energy comparisons
The Chicxulub impact, believed by most scientists to have been a significant factor in the extinction of the non-avian dinosaurs, has been estimated at 100 million (108) megatons, or Torino Scale 10. The impacts which created the Barringer Crater and the 1908 Tunguska event are both estimated to be in the 3–10 megaton range, corresponding to Torino Scale 8. The 2013 Chelyabinsk meteor had a total kinetic energy prior to impact of about 0.5 megatons, corresponding to Torino Scale 0. Between 2000 and 2013, 26 asteroid impacts with an energy of 1–600 kilotons were detected.

The biggest hydrogen bomb ever exploded, the Tsar Bomba, was around 50 megatons.
The 1883 eruption of Krakatoa was the equivalent of roughly 200 megatons.

The comet C/2013 A1, which passed close to Mars in 2014, was originally estimated to have a potential impact energy of 5 million to 24 billion megatons, and in March 2013 was estimated to have a Mars impact probability of ~1:1250, corresponding to the Martian equivalent of Torino Scale 6. The impact probability was reduced to ~1:120000 in April 2013, corresponding to Torino Scale 1 or 2.

Objects with non-zero Torino ratings

Currently non-zero

Downgraded to zero
This is a partial list of near-Earth asteroids that have been listed with a Torino Scale rating of 1+ and been lowered to 0 or been removed from the Sentry Risk Table altogether. Most objects that reach a Torino Scale of 1 have a short observation arc of less than 2 weeks and are quickly removed as the observation arc gets longer and more accurate.

 2023
 (diameter ~56 meters) with a 63 day observation arc showed a 1 in 430 chance of impact on 27 March 2026. The nominal distance from Earth on 27 March 2026 is now known to be  with a 3-sigma uncertainty region of about ±460,000 km.

 (diameter ~48 meters) with a 17.7 day observation arc showed a 1 in 360 chance of impact on 14 February 2046. It was lower to Torino scale 0 on 16 March 2023.
 (diameter ~280 meters) with a 15.2 day observation arc showed a cumulative 1 in 21,000 chance of impact on 10 January 2096. It was removed from the risk table on 8 February 2023.
 2022
 (diameter ~170 meters) with a 25 day observation arc showed a 1 in 2,000 chance of impact on 2 April 2064. With a 35-day observation arc, the odds were reduced to 1:150,000. The nominal distance from Earth on 2 April 2064 is now known to be  with a 3-sigma uncertainty region of about ±8 million km.
 (diameter ~40 meters) with a 8 day observation arc showed a 1-in-109 chance of impact on 4 September 2068. The nominal distance from Earth on 4 September 2068 is now known to be  with an uncertainty region of ±32 thousand km.
  (diameter ~160 meters) with a 22 day observation arc showed a 1 in 7,700 chance of impact on 11 July 2061. It was lowered to Torino Scale 0 with a 24 day observation arc.
  (diameter ~70 meters) with a 3-8 day observation arc showed about a 1 in 2,000 chance of impact (18 months later) on 4 July 2023. It was lowered to Torino Scale 0 on 20 January 2022 with a 16 day observation arc and a nominal approach of 7.9 million km.
 2021
  (diameter ~300 meters) with a 18.9 day observation arc showed a 1 in 56,000 chance of impact on 27 March 2081. It was removed from the Sentry risk list on 4 November 2021 with a 57 day observation arc and a nominal approach of 2.5 AU with an uncertainty region of ±18 million km.
  (diameter ~200 meters) with a 7.6 day observation arc showed a 1 in 6,700 chance of impact on 3 May 2034. It was removed from the ESA and Sentry Risk Table on 12 October 2021 when precovery images from 2010, 2015 and 2018 were located in the DECam and Pan-STARRS archives.
 2020
On 13 December 2020 precovery observations from 2013, 2016, and mid-2020 extended the observation arc from 8 days to 7.8 years allowing the asteroid to be removed from the Sentry Risk Table.
  (diameter ~600 meters) initially showed, with a 7.6 day observation arc, a 1 in 83,000 chance of impact on 3 August 2093. With a 11.2 day observation arc, the odds decreased to 1 in 7.1 million. However, the odds of an impact on 4 August 2104 increased to 1 in 45,000. With a 13.2 day observation arc, the 2104 impact was ruled out, but a 4 August 2101 impact became more probable, with the odds increasing to 1 in 36,000. It was removed from the sentry risk table entirely on July 31 with a 15.6 day observation arc.
  (diameter ~590 meters) with a 15-day observation showed a 1 in 290,000 chance of impact on 10 September 2074 and showed a 1 in 77,000 chance of impact on 9 September 2081. Cumulatively, this gave the asteroid a 1 in 59,000 chance of impact in the next century. The asteroid was downgraded to 0 after its arc was extended to 16 days with a 1 in 500,000 cumulative chance of impact. It was removed from the sentry risk table entirely on 11 March 2020.
  (diameter ~700 meters) with a 13-day observation arc showed a 1 in 180,000 chance of impact on 14 October 2046. But the nominal solution had the asteroid  from Earth on 14 October 2046. It was removed from the Sentry monitoring list on 10 February 2020 with 19 precovery images from January to April 2016.
 2019
 No asteroids reached Torino scale 1 in 2019.
 2018
  was removed from the Sentry monitoring list on 14 June 2018 after having been on the Risk List with a Torino Scale of Level 1.
  (diameter ~480 meters) with a 7-day observation arc showed a 1 in 270,000 chance of impact on 5 April 2111 using the 17 April 2018 orbit solution. Later on the same day it was removed from the Sentry Risk Table as a result of precovery images dating back to 24 September 2017 extending the observation arc to 205 days.
  was listed on the JPL Near Earth Object Risk List with a Torino Scale of Level 1 as of 20 January 2018. With a 40-day observation arc, it had an estimated 1 in 3000 chance of impacting Earth on 28 April 2057.
  was listed on the JPL Near Earth Object Risk List and NEODyS Risk List with a Torino Scale of Level 1 on 5 January 2018. With a 15-day observation arc, it had an estimated 1 in 21000 chance of impacting Earth on 30 June 2047. By 9 January 2018 the geocentric 30 June 2047 uncertainty region had shrunk to ±50 million km.
 2017
  was listed on the NEODyS Risk List with a Torino Scale of Level 1 on 8 February 2017. It is estimated be 900 meters in diameter with a 1 in 500000 chance of impact on 4 June 2095. Such an impact could create a crater 10 km in diameter. Follow-up observations on February 10 eliminated the chances of impact on every date except for 4 June 2044, with a 4.59E-10 chance of impact on that date, or less than a 1 in 2 billion chance of impact. It was removed from the Sentry Risk Table on 15 February 2017.
  was listed on the JPL Near Earth Object Risk List and NEODyS Risk List with a Torino Scale of Level 1 on 3 February 2017. With a 5-day observation arc, it had an estimated 1 in 1610 chance of impacting Earth on 3 August 2029. With a 6-day observation arc, the odds were 1 in 1270. With a 7-day observation arc, the odds were 1 in 909. With a 10-day observation arc, the odds were 1 in 826. The value decreased to 0 with further observations on February 11, with a cumulative impact chance of 1 in 4258.
  was listed on the JPL Near Earth Object Risk List and NEODyS Risk List with a Torino Scale of Level 1 on 19 January 2017. With a 14-day observation arc, it had an estimated 1 in 59,000 chance of impacting Earth on 1 August 2024. With a 16-day observation arc, the odds of impact were reduced to 1 in a million. It was removed from the Sentry Risk Table on 23 January 2017 with a 19-day observation arc.
 2016
  was listed on the JPL Near Earth Object Risk List with a Torino Scale of Level 1 on 25 December 2016, while the NEODyS Risk List has it at a lower impact probability, sufficient to classify it as Torino Scale Level 0. With a 15-day observation arc, it was listed with an estimated 1 in 105,000 chance of impacting Earth on 1 November 2110. It was removed from the Sentry Risk Table on 7 January 2017 with a 29-day observation arc.
  was listed on the JPL Near Earth Object Risk List with a Torino Scale of Level 1 on 25 November 2016, while the NEODyS Risk List has it at a lower impact probability, sufficient to classify it as Torino Scale Level 0. With a 10-day observation arc, it had an estimated 1 in 8000 chance of impacting Earth on 12 June 2065. It was discovered on 19 November 2016 by Mt. Lemmon Survey. It was removed from the Sentry Risk Table on 2 December 2016, when prediscovery images by Pan-STARRS from October 2016 and precovery images taken from Mauna Kea in July 2003 where located and included in the impact calculations.
  was rated at level 1 by NEODyS on 25 March 2016, but subsequently lowered to zero thanks to prediscovery observations by the Pan-STARRS survey.
  was rated at level 1 for a day on 25 January 2016 by the NEODyS system, and downgraded to level 0 the following day. On the Sentry system it never crossed the threshold between the two levels, due to a lower computed impact probability.
 2015
  was listed on NEODyS with a Torino Scale of Level 1 on 23 August 2015. Sentry also listed it with a Torino Scale of Level 1 on 24 August 2015. With a 10-day observation arc, it had an estimated 1 in 84,000 chance of impacting Earth on 15 January 2081. It was downgraded to level 0 on 8 September 2015. It was discovered on 13 August 2015 by the Space Surveillance Telescope.
  was listed on the JPL Near Earth Object Risk List with a Torino Scale of Level 1 on 22 July 2015 and again on 11 August 2015, while the NEODyS Risk List had it at a slightly lower impact probability, sufficient to classify it as Torino Scale Level 0. In July and August it was downgraded to Level 0 the following day. With a 13-day observation arc, it had an estimated 1 in 36,000 chance of impacting Earth on 5 October 2096. It was discovered on 12 July 2015 by Pan-STARRS.
 2014
  was listed on the Near Earth Object Risk List with a Torino Scale of Level 1 from after its discovery in November 2007 until recovered in March 2014. With an observation arc of 60 days, it had about a 1 in 1800 chance of impacting Earth on 3 June 2048; the probability went to effectively zero when the 2014 recovery observations were taken into account.
  with an estimated diameter of 100 meters was rated level 1 on 23 February 2014 with an observation arc of 5 days. It was estimated to have a 1 in 5,560 chance of impact on 2 February 2027. It was lowered to Torino Scale 0 on the next day (24 February 2014).
 2013
  (a near-Earth asteroid with a 450 m diameter) was rated level 1 on 16 October 2013 (with an observation arc of 7.3 days). It was downgraded to 0 on 3 November 2013. It was completely removed from the Sentry Risk Table on 8 November 2013 using JPL solution 32 with an observation arc of 27 days.
 2012
  was rated at Torino scale 1 from February 2011 to December 2012, for an impact on 5 February 2040. It was downgraded thanks to observations collected in October 2012 with telescopes on Mauna Kea, Hawaii.
  was rated at Torino scale 1 on 23 June 2012 with an observation arc of 4 days. With an observation arc of only 6 days it showed a 1 in 7140 chance of impact on 1 June 2015. It was removed from the Sentry Risk Table on June 25.
  was rated level 1 on 21 February 2012 (with an observation arc of 8.9 days). It was removed from the risk table on 3 March 2012.
 2011
  was rated level 1 on 4 November 2011 with an observation arc of 9 days. There was a 1 in 56,000 chance of impact on 8 July 2079. It was removed 17 November 2011.
  is an asteroid with a diameter of 2.6 km, which was rated level 1 on October 27, 2011 (with an observation arc of 9.6 days.) It was downgraded to 0 a few days later.
  was rated level 1 on 28 September 2011 with an observation arc of 2.6 days and listed virtual impactors in 2016 and 2019. But it was quickly downgraded to 0 a few days later and was removed from the risk table on 7 October 2011.
  was rated level 1 on 13 February 2011 with an observation arc of 13.8 days. There was a 1 in 24,000 chance of impact on 18 January 2086. It was removed from the risk table on 10 March 2011.
 2010
  was rated level 1 in December 2010, and downgraded to 0 on 2 January 2011.
  was rated level 1 on 18 May 2010 with an observation arc of 7 days. There was roughly an estimated 1 in 77,000 chance of impact on 26 June 2058. It was removed on 23 May 2010.
  was rated level 1 in February 2010, and downgraded to 0 on 9 April 2010. The chance of an actual collision with an asteroid like 2005 YU55 (~400 meters in diameter) is about 1 percent in the next thousand years.
 2009
  was rated level 1 on 28 December 2009 (with an observation arc of 10 days). It was downgraded to 0 by the end of December.
  was rated level 1 after its discovery on 17 November 2009, and downgraded by the end of November. It was not removed from the risk table until 26 June 2013.
  was rated level 1 after its discovery in May 2009 (with a 15-day observation arc), and downgraded to 0 by 11 June 2009. It was removed 17 June 2009.
 2008
  was rated level 1 until 14 February 2008. It was removed from the risk table on 19 December 2009.
 2007
  was rated level 1 on 3 July 2007 with an observation arc of 19 days. The asteroid was estimated to be  in diameter and there was a 1 in 556,000 chance of impact on 11 July 2082. It was removed from the risk table on 15 July 2007.
 was rated level 1 for one week ending 19 February 2007. It was removed from the risk table on February 22.
 2006
  was rated level 1 on December 22, 2006, when it had an observation arc of 25 days, but was removed from the Sentry Risk Table on February 7, 2007.
  (with an observation arc of 7 days) showed a 1 in 42000 chance of impacting Earth on 22 January 2029. It was removed from the Sentry Risk Table on 23 November 2006.
  was a lost asteroid from December 1997 that had an observation arc of 27 days. From early 2002 until 24 February 2006 it was estimated to have a 1 in 10,000 chance of impacting Earth on June 1, 2101. It was removed from the risk table on 24 February 2006 when it was serendipitously rediscovered.
  (using an observation arc of 475 days) was upgraded to level 2 in February 2006 for a possible 2102 encounter, making it the second asteroid rated above level 1. It was downgraded to 0 after further observations. It was removed from the Sentry Risk Table on 14 February 2008.
 2005
 No asteroids reached Torino scale 1 in 2005.
 2004
  (a near-Earth asteroid 370 meters in diameter) became the first object rated level 2 on 23 December 2004, and was subsequently upgraded to level 4 — the current record for highest Torino rating. (It is now known Apophis will pass 38000 km from Earth on 13 April 2029.) It retained a rating of level 1 for a 2036 approach due to the prior orbital uncertainties introduced by the close approach of 2029. In August 2006 Apophis was downgraded to 0. In 2021 Apophis was removed from the risk-list.
  was rated level 1 on 27 March 2004 with an observation arc of 6.9 days. It was lowered to 0 on 2 April 2004. It was removed on 13 April 2004.
  was rated level 1 on 1 March 2004 with an observation arc of 7.8 days. It was removed on 5 March 2004.
 2003
  was rated level 1 on 27 December 2003 with an observation arc of 8.7 days. It was removed from the risk table on 29 December 2003.
  was rated level 1 in early October 2003, and removed on 13 October 2003.
  was rated level 1 on 30 August 2003 and removed from the Sentry Risk Table on 14 September 2003.
  was rated level 1 on 7 July 2003 with an observation arc of 10 days. There was roughly an estimated 1 in 19,000 chance of impact on 9 June 2077. It was removed from the risk table on 29 July 2003.
  was rated level 1 on 2 April 2003, and removed from the risk table on 28 May 2003.
 2002
  was rated level 1 on 24 July 2002, and was removed from the risk table on 1 August 2002.
  was rated level 1 on 20 March 2002, and completely removed from the Sentry Risk Table on 26 April 2002.

See also
Asteroid impact avoidance
Impact event
Palermo Technical Impact Hazard Scale

References

External links
 The Torino Impact Hazard Scale as part of the Sentry monitoring system by CNEOS at JPL from NASA
 Asteroid and Comet Impact Hazards: The Torino Scale from NASA's Ames Research Center in the Internet Archive
 Impact Risk Page from NEODyS

American inventions
Alert measurement systems
Hazard scales
Units of measurement in astronomy
Planetary defense